The Ziegfeld Follies of the Air was a program broadcast on CBS Radio during the 1930s which attempted to bring the success of Florenz Ziegfeld's stage shows to the new medium of radio.

Eddie Dowling hosted the musical variety format. Sponsored by Chrysler Motors, the half-hour series aired Sunday evenings from April 3 to June 26, 1932, moving April 24 from 8:30 pm ET to 10:30 pm ET.

With Al Goodman leading the orchestra, the line-up of guests included Fanny Brice, Helen Morgan, Jack Pearl, Will Rogers, and Ziegfeld himself. Pearl introduced his "Baron Munchausen" character.

Ziegfeld died on July 22, 1932, but the series returned from February 22 to June 6, 1936, serving as a tribute to the showman. Goodman returned as orchestra leader, and Brice appeared in the sketch series that eventually expanded into The Baby Snooks Show. Other guests included Patty Chapin, James Melton, and Benny Fields. Few episodes survive.

References

Listen to
Radio Journeys: The Ziegfeld Follies of the Air (April 3, 1932)
Radio Journeys: The Ziegfeld Follies of the Air (April 10, 1932)

American variety radio programs
1930s American radio programs
1932 radio programme debuts
1932 radio programme endings
1936 radio programme debuts
1936 radio programme endings
CBS Radio programs